Crotchiella is a genus of longhorn beetles (family Cerambycidae). It has a single described species, Crotchiella brachyptera, which inhabits the Azores.

References

Endemic arthropods of the Azores
Cerambycidae genera
Beetles described in 1985